A census agglomeration is a census geographic unit in Canada determined by Statistics Canada. A census agglomeration comprises one or more adjacent census subdivisions that has a core population of 10,000 or greater. It is eligible for classification as a census metropolitan area once it reaches a population of 100,000.

At the 2011 Census, Canada had 114 census agglomerations.

List 
The following is a list of the census agglomerations within Canada.

See also 
Census geographic units of Canada
List of Canadian census agglomerations by province or territory
List of metropolitan areas in Canada

References

External links 
Statistics Canada – Census

Census agglomerations